Qaradağlı (also, Karadagly and Karadsely) is a village and municipality in the Beylagan Rayon of Azerbaijan.  It has a population of 690.

References 

Populated places in Beylagan District